Jairo Fabián Palomino Sierra (born August 2, 1988) is a Colombian footballer who plays as a defensive midfielder or centre back for Envigado .

Club career

Atlético Nacional

2011
Palomino played 16 matches and scored a single goal, also Atlético Nacional won the 2011 Categoría Primera A season Torneo Apertura.

Al-Ahli

2011-12
Palomino moved to Al-Ahli club for 4m USD in 2011. in the 2011–12 Saudi Professional League Al-Ahli were runner-up and Palomino played 17 matches and scored a single goal. In the 2012 King Cup of Champions Palomino played semi-final against Al-Hilal and he saved many dangerous balls and he showed his abilities as a great defender when they defeated Al-Hilal and thus his team qualified to the final and won the cup. Palomino helped Al-Ahli team in the 2012 AFC Champions League and it were runner-up.

2012-13
In the 2012–13 Saudi Professional League Palomino played 19 matches and scored a single goal. In the 2013 AFC Champions League Palomino and Al-Ahli qualified for the quarter-finals. In 2013, after the end of the season Palomino announced he was leaving Al-Ahli club because he was thinking of going to 2014 FIFA World Cup with national team Colombia.

International career
Palomino played for the Colombian U-20 national team (2007) as well as the Colombia national football team. On club level he played for Atlético Nacional in the Copa Mustang. He scored the second goal at the 2007 South American Youth Championship against Venezuela.

International goals

U-20

Club career statistics

Honours

Club
With - Atlético Nacional
Fútbol Profesional Colombiano: Apertura 2011.

With - Al-Ahli
King Cup of Champions: 2012.
Saudi Professional League: Runner-up;2011-12.
AFC Champions League: Runner-up;2012.

References

External links

1988 births
Living people
Colombian footballers
Colombian expatriate footballers
Colombia international footballers
Envigado F.C. players
Atlético Nacional footballers
Once Caldas footballers
Atlético Tucumán footballers
Al-Ahli Saudi FC players
Deportivo Pereira footballers
Categoría Primera A players
Categoría Primera B players
Argentine Primera División players
Saudi Professional League players
Expatriate footballers in Argentina
Expatriate footballers in Saudi Arabia
Sportspeople from Antioquia Department
Association football defenders